The 1989 Benson and Hedges Open was a men's Grand Prix tennis tournament held in Auckland, New Zealand. It was the 22nd of the tournament and was held from 9 January to 16 January 1989. Second-seeded Ramesh Krishnan won the singles title.

Finals

Singles

 Ramesh Krishnan defeated  Amos Mansdorf 6–4, 6–0
 It was Krishnan's only title of the year and the 8th of his career.

Doubles

 Steve Guy /  Shuzo Matsuoka defeated  John Letts /  Bruce Man-Son-Hing 7–6, 7–6
 It was Guy's only title of the year and the 1st of his career. It was Matsuoka's only title of the year and the 1st of his career.

References

External links
 
 ATP – tournament profile
 ITF – tournament edition details

Heineken Open
Heineken
ATP Auckland Open
January 1989 sports events in New Zealand